This is the list of notable stars in the constellation Dorado, sorted by decreasing brightness.

See also
Lists of stars by constellation

References

List
Dorado